The Daughter of Time Trilogy is the omnibus of the novels Reader, Writer, and Maker by biomedical scientist Erec Stebbins. The novels are space operas and metaphysical adventure fiction centered on the character Ambra Dawn, a slave with the ability to "read” and "write” spacetime. The trilogy features elements of cosmology, parallel universe (fiction), time travel, alternate history, prescience, telepathy, telekinesis, alien invasion, cybernetics, and spirituality, with the novels repeatedly breaking the fourth wall as characters speak directly to and request specific actions from the reader. Each novel is narrated in the first person by a different character.

Reviews

Publishers Weekly called the first novel "thoughtful science fiction” and ”a new and imaginative series.” Kirkus Reviews noted that Reader was "a richly detailed, compelling story about the power of love.” Foreword Reviews wrote of the series that "these are works that nurture wonder and sometimes break hearts.” Midwest Book Review comments that for Reader “mature teen and young adult readers alike will find Ambra's story involving and engrossing,” and that Writer is “another epic story.”

Critical comments note that “it retreads some of the same paths repeatedly,” "by plot alone, Reader sounds fairly ordinary,” “the narrative bogs down at times due to overly long inner monologue,” and that the ending is “incomprehensible.”

Characters

Reader (Daughter of Time, Book 1)
 Ambra Dawn - Narrator, Earth woman, the "Daughter of Time” and central protagonist
 Thel of Xix - Alien and Ambra Dawn’s first mentor
 Waythrel of Xix - Ambra Dawn’s Advocate on Dram and second mentor
 Richard Cross - Leader of the resistance to the Dram hegemony

Writer (Daughter of Time, Book 2)
 Nitin Ratava - Narrator, lover/consort of Ambra Dawn, Earth Force soldier
 Ambra Dawn - The "Daughter of Time” and central series protagonist
 Waythrel of Xix - Alien and close advisor and confidant of Ambra Dawn
 Sepehr Mazandarani - Counselor of Ambra Dawn
 Tomoko Mizoguchi - Former Major of Earth Force and Leader of the Temple Guardians
 Aisha Williams - Warrant Officer to Captain Ratava
 David Kim - Master Sergeant to Captain Ratava
 Ryan Marshall - Sergeant First Class, medical officer to Captain Ratava
 Erica Fox - Sergeant and engineer to Captain Ratava
 Grant Moore - Weapons Sergeant to Captain Ratava
 Synphel of Xix - Alien and reproductive-group mate of Waythrel
 
Maker (Daughter of Time, Book 3)
 Waythrel of Xix - Narrator, alien and close advisor and confidant of Ambra Dawn
 Ambra Dawn - The "Daughter of Time” and central series protagonist
 Kloan - Clone of Ambra Dawn, kidnapper of Waythrel of Xix
 Nitin Ratava - Lover/consort of Ambra Dawn, Earth Force soldier
 Synphel of Xix - Alien and reproductive-group mate of Waythrel

See also

 Erec Stebbins
 The Ragnarök Conspiracy
 Intel 1 Series

References

External links
 Daughter of Time Trilogy Author Website

American science fiction novels
2015 American novels
Novel series